The 2009–10 GP2 Asia Series season was the third season of the GP2 Asia Series. It began on 31 October 2009 and ended on 14 March 2010 after four double-header rounds.

Season summary 
All teams from the 2009 GP2 Series season except for Racing Engineering were due to take part, with the thirteenth slot being filled by MalaysiaQi-Meritus.com. Durango withdrew from the season for financial reasons. The season was the last to use the first specification of the GP2/05 car, as used in Europe between 2005 and 2007.

Davide Valsecchi of iSport International won the drivers' championship title, clinching it with three races to spare, in Bahrain after a comprehensive performance in the first five races, winning a race at each of the first three meetings with two seconds before clinching the title. He added a fourth second place at the final round, to seal a 27-point championship-winning margin. Second place was settled by a tie-breaker between a pair of Italian drivers, MalaysiaQi-Meritus.com driver Luca Filippi and DPR's Giacomo Ricci. Despite not scoring in any of the sprint races to be held, a win and two second places in feature races for Filippi compared to six top-five finishes – including a first GP2 win at the final Bahrain race – for Ricci allowed Filippi to take the runner-up spot. Arden International drivers completed the top-five placings with Javier Villa fourth despite missing the first meeting at Abu Dhabi, and Charles Pic fifth, the only other driver to win a race during the campaign, winning at the first Bahrain meeting. In the teams' championship, iSport won the championship with two races to spare, after the points amassed by Valsecchi and Oliver Turvey put them out of reach of their rivals. Second place, 36 points behind iSport, were Arden due to the strong performances of Villa and Pic, while Ricci's DPR squad finished third, a point further back.

Entry list
All of the teams used the Dallara GP2/05 chassis with Renault-badged 4.0 litre (244 cu in) naturally-aspirated Mecachrome V8 engines order and with tyres supplied by Bridgestone.

Calendar
The season started with a two-day test over 23–24 October 2009 in Abu Dhabi at the new Yas Marina Circuit. The series returned there a week later for the opening championship rounds, in support of the 2009 Abu Dhabi Grand Prix.

A further round took place in Abu Dhabi, before the series moved to Bahrain.

Race Calendar and results

Championship standings
Scoring system
Points are awarded to the top 8 classified finishers in the Feature race, and to the top 6 classified finishers in the Sprint race. The pole-sitter in the feature race will also receive two points, and one point is given to the driver who set the fastest lap inside the top ten in both the feature and sprint races. No extra points are awarded to the pole-sitter in the sprint race.

Feature race points

Sprint race points
Points are awarded to the top 6 classified finishers.

Drivers' Championship

Notes:
† — Drivers did not finish the race, but were classified as they completed over 90% of the race distance.

Teams' Championship

Notes:
† — Drivers did not finish the race, but were classified as they completed over 90% of the race distance.

Notes

References

External links
GP2 Asia Series official website

GP2 Asia Series seasons
GP2 Asia
GP2 Asia
GP2 Asia Series
GP2 Asia Series